Sirous Taherian سیروس طاهریان (born 20 August 1965) is an Iranian player and coach of water polo. He is a goalkeeper who played in a 1990, 1994, 1998 and won at Asian Games. As a coach he won in the 2015 FINA World Water Polo Development Trophy. He is now a technical staff director of the Iran national water polo team.

References

1965 births
Iranian male water polo players
Living people
20th-century Iranian people